Serkan Kaya may refer to:

 Serkan Kaya (athlete) (born 1984), Turkish long-distance runner
 Serkan Kaya (singer) (born 1977), Turkish singer, songwriter and composer
  (born 1977), German-born Turkish actor who played opposite Drew Sarich